Lullaby is a popular children's album released by "The Rainbow Collections" (singer Sophie Barker and musician KK) on 14 June 2005.  Barker is best known for her work with Zero 7.   Two follow up albums,  "Toybox" and "Snowflake" were released by Sony Music in 2010.

Tracks

"Twinkle Twinkle Little Star" – 3:21  
"Somewhere Over the Rainbow" – 2:53  
"Ride a Cock Horse" – 0:12  
"Lavender Blue" – 2:15  
"Frere Jacques" – 1:05  
"There Was a Crooked Man" – 0:13  
"Sing a Song of Sixpence" – 2:45  
"Little Bo Peep" – 2:13  
"Baa Baa Black Sheep" – 3:46  
"Little Miss Muffet" – 0:12  
"Brahms Lullaby" – 2:36  
"Oranges and Lemons" – 1:45  
"Hush Little Baby" – 0:54  
"Rock a Bye Baby" – 1:42  
"Dream a Little Dream" – 2:00  
"The Owl and the Pussycat" – 0:27  
"Row Your Boat" – 4:36  
"Silent Night" – 2:49

References

See also 
http://www.sophiebarker.com/lullaby.php
[ Lullaby on allmusic.com]

2000 albums
Arista Records albums
Sophie Barker albums